H.K. Porter, Inc. (Porter) manufactured light-duty railroad locomotives in the US, starting in 1866.  The company became the largest producer of industrial locomotives, and built almost eight thousand of them.  The last locomotive was built in 1950, but the company continues to produce industrial equipment to this day.

Porter was known for building locomotives that were much smaller than those normally used by the larger Class I railroads.  The company's locomotives were small enough that they were often operated by only one person.  Porter built mostly steam locomotives, but they also built some powered by gasoline and diesel engines, and some that ran on compressed air.

The largest collection of Porter photographs and information is currently housed in the Kentlein Porter Collection at the A. C. Kalmbach Memorial Library (a service of the National Model Railroad Association) in Chattanooga, TN.  Many of the 780 builder's photos, blueprints and other locomotive data were republished in Porter Steam Locomotives, published by the library.

Timeline

1866: Henry Kirke Porter formed a partnership with John Y. Smith and they called the company Smith & Porter.  The two opened a small machine shop on 28th Street in Pittsburgh, Pennsylvania, and begin repairing and building industrial equipment.  They received an order for their first locomotive on March 4, 1867, and built the Joshua Rhodes for the New Castle Railroad and Mining Company.  They went on to build 43 locomotives together, including the Minnetonka (preserved at the Lake Superior Museum of Transportation).  They specialized in four wheeled, saddle tank locomotives for small industrial railroads.

1871: Fire broke out in the shop on February 7, destroying twelve locomotives under construction, the shop, and 23 adjacent structures.  Total losses were estimated at $200,000, and the partnership was dissolved.  Smith formed Smith & Dawson Locomotives, which became National Locomotive Works.  Porter formed a partnership with Arthur W. Bell, called Porter, Bell & Co., and they built their first locomotive for the Jackson Furnace Co. of Michigan.  They expanded their range to include light passenger engines and small freight engines, primarily for narrow gauge railroads. They built 223 locomotives, until Arthur Bell died in May 1878.

1878: Henry K. Porter continued the business on his own, as H.K. Porter & Co.  He had established a reputation as a builder of rugged, specialized locomotives.  He could custom build a locomotive quickly and efficiently, with a system of interchangeable parts; pistons, wheels and boilers in various sizes that can be combined to suit a customer's requirements.  Some of the basic designs were kept in stock, and could be ordered off the shelf.

1890: Porter built their first compressed-air locomotive, for a coal mine in Pennsylvania.  Air was stored in two tanks, and used to drive the pistons instead of steam.  This allowed locomotive use inside mines without the fumes of burning coal, or the dangers of high-pressure steam.  Porter went on to build over 400 compressed-air locomotives for use in mines, plants, and the street railways of New Orleans.  Others built compressed-air locomotives, but by 1900 Porter had captured 90% of the market.

1899: Henry Porter incorporated the company as the H.K. Porter Co., Inc.  He built a new plant at 49th and Harrison Street in Pittsburgh.  Production peaked in 1906, with almost 400 locomotives built that year.

1911: Porter built their first gasoline-powered locomotive, and in 1915 they built their first fireless locomotive, using a large pressure vessel to hold steam and hot water in place of a boiler.  These proved to be more useful than compressed-air locomotives, and soon Porter dominated this niche market.

1919: Porter was selected to build twenty 4-6-0 45-class mainline locomotives for the Manila Railroad Company in the Philippines to replace its aging British tank locomotives. Its efficiency and low cost of maintenance led the Manila Railroad to use the Porter design for larger locomotives built by Alco and Baldwin.

1921: The H.K. Porter Co. was prosperous, enjoying a post-World War I reconstruction boom in Europe, and a road construction boom in the US. Porters were a favorite choice among grading contractors, who used light, portable tracks to carry the wooden tipper-cars that were the earthmoving equipment of the day. Henry Porter, still running the company at age 81, died on April 10.

1939: After a long decline, the H.K. Porter Co. declared bankruptcy. Thomas Mellon Evans purchased the company, determined to turn it around.  He bought other manufacturing companies, adding them to his collection. Locomotive production increased again during World War II, and the company was recognized for its service to the country in 1942, but demand for steam locomotives dwindled post-war, and H.K. Porter became primarily a holding company for the many subsidiaries Evans had acquired.

1950: The company built its last locomotive, which was exported to Brazil. The parts business and all the required patterns were sold to the Davenport Locomotive Works in Iowa.

1950s–1960s: Electrical Division National Electric Defense Products Facilities manufactured rocket motor bodies for Nike family of guided missiles.

1969: The company acquired a saw manufacturer Shurly & Dietrich, which continued operations until 1973.

Divisions
The company had the following industrial divisions and subsidiaries:
 Rubber and Friction Products
 Thermoid Division
 Electrical Equipment
 Delta Star Electric Division
 National Electric Division
 Copper and Alloys
 Riverside Alloy Metal Division
 Refractories
 Refractories Division
 Electric Furnace Steel
 Connors Steel Division
 Vulcan-Kidd Steel Division
 Fabricated Products
 Disston Division
 Forge and Fittings Division
 Leschen Wire Rope Division
 Mouldings Division

The company wholly owned a Canadian subsidiary, H.K. Porter Company Ltd., which was subdivided in the following order:
 Refractories Division
 Disston Tools Division
 Federal Wires and Cables Division
 Nepcoduct Systems Division

Gallery

See also

List of locomotive builders

References

External links

 Preserved H.K. Porter locomotive list
  Links to many Porter pages
 A.C. Kalmbach Memorial Library

Defunct locomotive manufacturers of the United States
Manufacturing companies based in Pittsburgh
Articles containing video clips